The Mfezi is an armoured ambulance used by the South African Military Health Service. The name Mfezi is a Zulu word that means cobra. The snake is the emblem of the South African Operational Medical Orderly who operate and use these vehicles, therefore armoured ambulances are named for snakes in South African military service.

History
The Mfezi replaced the Rinkhals armoured ambulance at the end of the Angolan Bush War although it is believed that one Mfezi Ambulance was operationally tested in Angola during the closing stages of the Bush War.

Design
The Mfezi is a  armoured vehicle capable of withstanding 3 × TM-57 landmines/ TNT under any wheel and two TM-57/ TNT under the hull. The sides are armoured to withstand up to 7.62×51mm small arms fire.

The Mfezi is operated by two medical orderlies and has the capacity to hold four patients lying down and four sitting. The configuration of the inside of the vehicle can be changed as needed according to the situation, although this requires a workshop intervention.

References

Wheeled military vehicles
Military vehicles of South Africa
Military ambulances
Military vehicles introduced in the 1990s